Maksim Sanets (born 4 April 1997) is a Belarusian professional footballer who plays for Bumprom Gomel.

References

External links
 
 
 Profile at pressball.by

1997 births
Living people
Belarusian footballers
Association football midfielders
FC Gomel players
FC Krumkachy Minsk players
FC Torpedo Minsk players
FC Lokomotiv Gomel players
FC Sputnik Rechitsa players
FC Isloch Minsk Raion players
FC Slutsk players